A university technical college (UTC) is a type of specialist secondary school in England that is led by a sponsor university and has close ties to local business and industry. These university and industry partners support the curriculum development of the UTC, can provide professional development opportunities for teachers, and guide suitably qualified students on to  industrial apprenticeships or tertiary education. The sponsor university appoints the majority of the UTC's governors and key members of staff. Pupils transfer to a UTC at the age of 14, part-way through their secondary education. The first UTCs were established in 2010.

Although there are examples of UTCs achieving the outcomes for which they were intended, such as UTC Reading, they have not all been successful. Approximately fifteen have closed or converted to other arrangements since the programme was introduced.

Description
A university technical college is not a university or a technical college. It is one of 50 or so secondary schools, that have been sponsored by a college with university status. It is a non-selective free school funded directly by the Department for Education, free to attend, and outside the control of the local education authority. Capital costs came from a government grant, and revenue is dependent on pupil numbers.

UTCs were introduced in 2010 by the coalition government under the free schools programme. Michael Gove was the responsible minister at the time, although in 2018 he explained he had opposed the idea but was overridden by George Osborne and David Cameron, who had been lobbied by Lord Baker. UTCs are collectively distinctive in a number of ways. They all have a university as a lead sponsor; further education colleges, charitable organisations and the private sector may co-sponsor a UTC, however they must be led by a university. Like studio schools, University Technical Colleges enroll students aged 14–19, whereas free schools and academies can choose the age range of their pupils. Existing schools cannot convert to become a UTC; all UTCs have to be newly founded schools with no direct transfer intake of pupils.

A distinctive element of UTCs is that they offer technically oriented courses of study, combining National Curriculum requirements with technical and vocational elements. UTCs must specialise in subjects that require technical and modern equipment, but they also all teach business skills and the use of information and communications technology (ICT). UTCs are also supposed to offer clear routes into higher education or further learning in work.

When operating, UTCs receive the same per capita funding as other schools in the local authority, calculated by the same formula, and £87 extra to cover UTC specific administration. This would be £5150 per head in Cheshire in 2021 for a non-disadvantaged child.

The university technical college programme as a whole is sponsored by the Baker Dearing Educational Trust, which promotes the setting up of UTCs. The trust was co-founded by Lord Baker, a Conservative politician and former Secretary of State for Education. Each UTC pays an annual licence fee (£10,000 in 2019) to the trust. Baker Dearing's promotion of UTCs is supported by the Edge Foundation, the Gatsby Charitable Foundation and the Garfield Weston Foundation. Many large companies have pledged to co-sponsor UTCs including Arup, British Airways, Ford, Jaguar Land Rover and Sony.

In 2017, 48 colleges were open. In May 2021, 50 UTCs had been opened of which 11 had closed, and Sir Simon Milton Westminster UTC about to become the twelfth.

Government minister Elizabeth Berridge told MPs on 29 April 2021 that the government hopes to have a "strong sustainable group of UTCs" by the autumn. She said more could be created only "if there is a bid with a clear vision for the involvement of employers and particularly with the support of the local authority".

Criticism
The establishment of university technical colleges was criticised by some teaching unions, who claimed they will cause further fragmentation of local provision of education for 16- to 19-year-olds. Others have argued that because they offer similar programmes of study, UTCs will divert funds away from further education colleges.

The age intake range of UTCs have also been criticised, with unions arguing that 14 is too early an age for most children to receive such a specialised education. It has also been suggested that the technical and vocational aspects of UTCs will create a two-tier education system, with UTCs being less well regarded than more academically orientated schools. Parents may be unwilling to move their children at 12, then again at 14, particularly to a new and untested school.

By February 2017, eight UTCs had closed or converted to other school types owing to low pupil numbers. Michael Gove, who as Education minister was a driving force behind the UTC policy, wrote in 2017 that it "had not worked", owing to lack of academic rigour.

With the publication of the report on the Medway UTC, in May 2018, five of the 26 UTCs inspected by Ofsted had been placed in special measures. George Osborne told a hearing of the Education Select Committee on 2 May 2018 that the model of seeking to move children at the age of 14 has not worked.

In June and July 2018, three further UTC's were rated as "inadequate" by Ofsted – Derby Manufacturing UTC, UTC@Harbourside and Health Futures UTC. UTC@Harbourside closed at the end of the academic year 2018–2019, which made it the ninth UTC to close.

In July 2019, in a statement on their website, South Wiltshire UTC announced it would not be accepting new students in September 2019, but would be supporting Year 11 & 13 students to finish their 2-year courses as intended before closing in August 2020. A previous Ofsted inspection that took place in February 2018 found the college to be inadequate.

A 2018 report by the Education Policy Institute found that more than half of enrolled students left after two years, and academic results lagged other state-funded schools.

By 2019, 31 of the 40 UTCs with published accounts owed money to the Education and Skills Funding Agency, having failed to attract sufficient pupils to make them financially viable. For example, Burnley UTC was built for 800 students but only enrolled 113 in the first three years. Research by accountancy firm Price Bailey found "UTCs with tight cashflow could be seriously affected by these clawbacks. After salaries, which often make up 70%-80% of the budget, there isn’t a lot left. £350,000 per school is the equivalent to seven or eight teachers, so in some cases cuts to staff numbers may be necessary, which could impact educational standards".

Evaluation
The National Audit Office assessed the effectiveness of the 58 UTCs in October 2019. It found that the UTC programme had cost £792m since it was launched in 2010. Many schools were at less than half capacity, and often produced worse results than equivalent secondary schools. 4,863 students were attending UTCs that were rated as inadequate, and while 37% of equivalent school students took the English Baccalaureate, at UTCs only 6% did.

Accolades
Despite the criticisms and problems noted above, two UTCs have been able to flourish. UTC Reading was the first UTC to be judged as "Outstanding" by Ofsted (in June 2015) and to be awarded the World Class Schools Quality Mark (in December 2017). UTC Reading was joined by Energy Coast UTC as Ofsted "Outstanding" in summer 2019.

List of UTCs

Closed UTCs

Converted away from UTC model

Rebrokered and reopened within UTC model

See also
Academy (English school)
City Technology College
Free school (England)
Studio school
TVEI
Maths school

References

External links
 University technical colleges (2015) How to apply
 University Technical Colleges

 
School types
State schools in the United Kingdom